Lovrić is a Croatian and Serbian surname. It is probably one of the many surnames derived from the Kačić noble family.

The etymology may be derived from the word lovor, meaning "laurel", or the given name Lovro (Lawrence); and the suffix -ić.

Notable people with the surname include:
 Boris Lovrić (born 1975), Croatian bobsledder
 Darko Lovrić (born 1980), Serbian football player
 Dragan Lovrić (born 1996), Croatian footballer
 Drago Lovrić (born 1961), Croatian general
 Elis Lovrić, Croatian singer-songwriter and actress
 Francesco Lovrić (born 1995), Austrian footballer
 Franjo Lovrić (1923–1982), Bosnian and Yugoslav footballer and manager
 Igor Lovrić  (born 1987), Croatian soccer player (goalkeeper)
 Ivan Lovrić (ca. 1756–77), also known as Giovanni Lovrich , Croatian writer and ethnographer
 Ivan Lovrić (footballer) (born 1985), Croatian football player
 Ivana Lovrić (born 1984), Croatian handball player
 Josip Lovrić (born 1968), Bosnian-Herzegovinian basketball player
 Karmen Sunčana Lovrić (born 1986), Croatian actress
 Kristijan Lovrić (born 1995), Croatian professional footballer
 Ljubomir Lovrić (1920–1994), Serbian football player and manager
 Sandi Lovrić (born 1998), Slovenian footballer
 Đuka Lovrić (1927–1957), Yugoslav footballer

See also
Lovrich (disambiguation)

Croatian surnames
Serbian surnames
Patronymic surnames